Have You Ever Seen Fireflies? is a play written by Yılmaz Erdoğan. A feature film based on the play was released in 2021 via Netflix, directed by Andaç Haznedaroglu and starring Yılmaz Erdoğan, Ecem Erkek and Engin Alkan.

Production 
Erdoğan began writing the play while he was serving at the Air Force Academy. It was performed for the first time on 23 January 1999 at the Beşiktaş Cultural Center in Istanbul. Erdoğan was given a day's leave to attend the premiere.

The play had a cast of 17 people and was released with the sponsorship of Telsim. During its run in Istanbul it was staged 97 times between 23 January 1999 and 23 May 1999. Later that same year during June, the play was performed in Bursa, Denizli, Antalya, Isparta, Adana, Tarsus, Mersin and Cyprus, as well as Anatolia. The following year the production went on a temporary hiatus due to the pregnancy of actor Demet Akbağ and by November, the play had been staged a total of 505 times. In August 2002 Erdoğan stated that the play had been viewed by 1 million people.

Original cast 
 Yılmaz Erdoğan
 Demet Akbağ
 Zerrin Sümer
 Sinan Bengier
 Salih Kalyon
 Altan Erkekli
 Bican Günalan
 Gürdal Tosun
 Figen Evren
 Neslihan Yeldan
 Caner Alkaya
 Deniz Özerman
 Şebnem Sönmez // Binnur Kaya
 Vural Çelik

Awards 
 3rd Afife Theatre Awards
 Cevat Fehmi Başkut Special Award: Yılmaz Erdoğan
 Most Successful Actress in a Musical or Comedy: Demet Akbağ
 Most Successful Supporting ACtress: Şebnem Sönmez
 Most Successful Theatre Score: Metin Kalender
 Avni Dilligil Theatre Awards
 Best Production: Sen Hiç Ateşböceği Gördün mü?
 Most Successful Playwright: Yılmaz Erdoğan
 Most Successful Supporting Actress: Zerrin Sümer
 Most Successful Theatre Score: Metin Kalender

Film adaptation 
A film adaptation of the play was released on April 9, 2021, on Netflix. It starred Yılmaz Erdoğan as Patron and also featured Ecem Erkek and Merve Dizdar. Erdoğan had previously spoken about his desire to create a feature film adaptation as early as 2009.

Cast and characters

References

External links 

 
 

2021 films
Turkish comedy-drama films
2020s Turkish-language films
Turkish-language Netflix original films
2021 comedy-drama films